"The Lottery in Babylon" (original Spanish: "La lotería en Babilonia", "The Babylon Lottery") is a fantasy short story by Argentine writer Jorge Luis Borges. It first appeared in 1941 in the literary magazine Sur, and was then included in the 1941 collection The Garden of Forking Paths (El jardín de los senderos que se bifurcan), which in turn became the part one of Ficciones (1944).

Plot summary
The story describes a mythical Babylon in which all activities are dictated by an all-encompassing lottery, a metaphor for the role of chance in one's life.  Initially, the lottery was run as a lottery would be, with tickets purchased and the winner receiving a monetary reward. Later, punishments and larger monetary rewards were introduced. Further, participation became mandatory for all but the elite.  Finally, it simultaneously became so all-encompassing and so secret some whispered "the Company has never existed, and never will," and some even posited that the question of the existence of the Company was irrelevant, as Babylon "is nothing but an infinite game of chance."

Themes
The story is about the role that chance plays in life, whether occurrences are genuinely deserved or whether all of life is merely based on luck or loss. The story references Zeno's paradox by using the lottery as a metaphor for all the possible random occurrences that could occur between any two points in time. As with fate, the Babylonians attempted to gain control of the lottery by whispering in secret places, though the lottery eventually banned this as a liability. The story may be a criticism of the tendency of humans to claim the authority of nature and capitalize on it, as the Company does with chance. The Lottery cannot be challenged, as it is based on the absolute that is chance. As with most Borges stories, there is a bit of humor in this. At one point, a slave steals a lottery ticket that calls for the bearer's tongue to be burned off, which is the same penalty as for stealing a lottery ticket. The public then fight over whether the slave should be punished because it is the penalty for stealing or because it is what the ticket decreed.

See also
 Rota Fortunae
 "The Lottery"

References

External links
 Complete text of the story in the original Spanish: 
 Complete text of the story in English translation: 

1941 short stories
Short stories by Jorge Luis Borges
Fictional secret societies
Works originally published in Sur (magazine)
Argentine speculative fiction works
Works about lotteries